The Inferior Oolite is a sequence of Jurassic age sedimentary rocks in Europe. It was deposited during the Middle Jurassic. The Inferior Oolite Group as more recently defined is a Jurassic lithostratigraphic group (a sequence of rock strata) in southern and eastern England . It has been variously known in the past as the Under Oolite (or Oolyte), the Inferior Oolite, the Inferior Oolite Series and the Redbourne Group.

Outcrops
The rocks are exposed from Dorset and Somerset eastwards and northwards through the English Midlands to Yorkshire. It is present at depth in the Wessex-Weald Basin, where it reaches its greatest thickness of 120 m.

Lithology and stratigraphy

The group consists of up to 120 m thickness of oolitic limestones and subordinate sandstones and mudstones laid down during the Jurassic Period. In the East Midlands it consists of (in descending order i.e. oldest last) the Lincolnshire Limestone, Grantham and Northampton Sand formations whereas in the Cotswold Hills it consists of the Salperton Limestone, Aston Limestone and Birdlip Limestone formations.
The limestones are rich in organic material. The ammonite Parkinsonia parkinsoni, an index fossil for the Bathonian, is native to the Inferior Oolite of Burton Bradstock.

Within Dorset, the Oolite is not subdivided into separately named formations, but is simply considered the Inferior Oolite Formation, sometimes subdivided into the Lower and Upper Inferior Oolite Formations. Within the vicinity of Yeovil it is divided into members which are in ascending order the Corton Denham Member, which predominantly consists of blue siltstone is about 2.5 m thick with the transitional top consisting of green Marl, the Oborne Ironshot Member, the term "ironshot" refers to ferruginised Oolite. The upper portion of which contains intensely bioturbated limestone. Moving Into the Upper Inferior Oolite the Sherborne Limestone Member, which consists of exposed yellow brown fresh grey bioclastic  limestone, while the overlying Combe Limestone Member, consists of rubbly limestone and marl, a full stratigraphy of the locality is given below

Vertebrate fauna
Ornithopod tracks geographically located in North Yorkshire, England. Ornithopod and theropod tracks present in North Yorkshire, England. A supposed dermal spine long thought to be from a stegosaur is actually a caudal vertebra referable to Archosauria indet.

See also

 List of dinosaur-bearing rock formations

Footnotes

References
 M. J. Benton and P. S. Spencer. 1995. Fossil Reptiles of Great Britain. Chapman & Hall, London 1-386
 J. B. Delair. 1973. The dinosaurs of Wiltshire. The Wiltshire Archaeological and Natural History Magazine 68:1-7
 Weishampel, David B.; Dodson, Peter; and Osmólska, Halszka (eds.): The Dinosauria, 2nd, Berkeley: University of California Press. 861 pp. .

Limestone formations
Geologic formations of England
Jurassic England
Middle Jurassic Europe
Aalenian Stage
Bajocian Stage
Bathonian Stage
Jurassic System of Europe